KBIA (91.3 FM), is a National Public Radio-member station in Columbia, Missouri. It carries regional news coverage, locally produced news shows, original talk shows, as well as NPR news programs including All Things Considered and Morning Edition.

The station is owned by the University of Missouri, and operates its own independent newsroom. The stations hosts Broadcast and Radio students from the Missouri School of Journalism. KBIA also operates satellite stations KKTR 89.7 in Kirksville (owned by Truman State University), and KAUD 90.5 in Mexico, Missouri.

KBIA also broadcasts three HD Radio services: KBIA2, which airs classical music (that is simulcast on KMUC); and KBIA3, which airs an AAA format and carries normal KBIA programming when the main service airs special coverage.

History 
KBIA signed on May 1, 1972, from room 11 of Jesse Hall at the University of Missouri. Its transmitter is co-located with KOMU-TV. 

In November 2014, KBIA announced it would purchase KWWC-FM (90.5) from neighboring Stephens College.  The sale completed, and the classical music format that used to be heard weekdays on KBIA has moved to KMUC. KBIA transitioned into a news/talk/information station similar to sister stations KCUR-FM Kansas City and KWMU St. Louis.

In 2021, KBIA moved their newsroom to Lee Hills Hall to be co-located with The Columbia Missourian, Vox, and Missouri Business Alert.

In 2022, KBIA and KOMU-TV will move to a new tower near the current tower location.

References

External links
KBIA official website

University of Missouri
NPR member stations
BIA